Michael Bennett is a series of thriller books by James Patterson. It follows Michael Bennett, an Irish American New York City detective, as he solves crimes and raises his ten adopted children.

Books 

Step on a Crack (2007) – Michael Bennett must free the celebrities and billionaires held hostage at a First Lady’s funeral before it's too late.
Run for Your Life (2009) – A serial killer called “the Teacher” is killing off Manhattanites who break his idea of courtesy.
Worst Case (2010) – Someone is kidnapping the children of wealthy families, but he doesn't ask for any ransom. 
Tick Tock (2011) – Michael Bennett has to cut into vacation time with his family as a serial killer rips New York apart with a string of horrifying murders. 
I, Michael Bennett (2012) – A South American drug lord terrorizes New York City as Michael Bennett does his best to force this criminal mastermind to stand trial for his crimes.
Gone (2013) - Following his angering of a powerful drug lord, Bennett and his family are in a witness protection program out in the boondocks of California.
Burn (2014) - Bennett investigates a high society dining club suspected of practicing ritual murder and cannibalism.
Alert (2015) - New York City is reeling from a wave of high-profile assassinations which are only a prelude to a more shocking and widespread terrorist plot.
Bullseye (2016) - The U.S. President's life is threatened by a mysterious conspiracy of snipers during an intense international conference in New York.
Haunted (2017) - On vacation, local kids start disappearing and Michael Bennett is asked to investigate.
Ambush (2018) - An anonymous tip about a crime in New York proves to be a set-up that takes down an officer, but not Michael Bennett.
Blindside (2019) - The NYC mayor has a daughter who's missing and in danger. Michael Bennett has a son in prison. They make a deal.
The Russian (2021) - Weeks before NYPD Detective Michael Bennett is to marry his longtime love, Mary Catherine, an assassin announces his presence in the city with a string of grisly murders.
 
Alert, Burn, Run for Your Life, Step on a Crack, Worst Case, and Tick Tock, were #1 New York Times Bestsellers.

Reviews 

“A fantastic tale of an audacious mass kidnapping and the unlikely detective thrust into the primary role of negotiator, sleuth and hero.” Publishers Weekly
“What sets this thriller apart from most others is the leap-off-the-pages character of Michael Bennett --- grieving husband, loving father and honorable detective. A modern-day hero, for sure.” Book Reporter
“This top-notch mystery with a first-class cast will rivet readers and whet their appetites for the next in the Bennett series.” RT Book Reviews

References

External links 
 James Patterson

Book series introduced in 2007
Novels by James Patterson